Kirill Sergeyevich Kravtsov (born 14 June 2002) is a Russian football player who plays as a defensive midfielder for Sochi.

Club career
He made his debut in the Russian Premier League for FC Zenit Saint Petersburg on 13 March 2021 in a game against FC Akhmat Grozny. He substituted Magomed Ozdoyev in the 83rd minute.

On 11 February 2022, Zenit loaned Kravtsov to FC Nizhny Novgorod until the end of the 2022–23 season, reserving the right to terminate the loan early. On 10 June 2022, Zenit recalled Kravtsov from loan.

On 22 July 2022, Kravtsov moved to Sochi.

Honours
Zenit Saint Petersburg
 Russian Premier League: 2020–21, 2021–22
 Russian Super Cup: 2021

Career statistics

Club

References

External links
 
 

2002 births
Footballers from Saint Petersburg
Living people
Russian footballers
Russia youth international footballers
Russia under-21 international footballers
Association football midfielders
FC Zenit-2 Saint Petersburg players
FC Zenit Saint Petersburg players
FC Nizhny Novgorod (2015) players
PFC Sochi players
Russian Premier League players
Russian Second League players